Richard Downing Airport is a public use airport located three nautical miles north of Coshocton, Ohio.

Facilities 
Richard Downing Airport has one runway designated 4/22 with an asphalt surface measuring 5,001 by 75 feet (1,524 x 23 m). Parking includes hangars and tie-downs for visiting aircraft. Fuel service offers 100LL and Jet-A.

A restaurant, "The Fly In Patio Grill" is open on the weekends during summer months.

References 

Airports in Ohio
Buildings and structures in Coshocton County, Ohio
Transportation in Coshocton County, Ohio